El Tigre is a city of Venezuela located in the state Anzoátegui. It is the capital of Simón Rodríguez Municipality and it is located south in Anzoategui state, equidistant from the Orinoco River and the Caribbean Sea in the Guanipa Mesa at 295 m altitude, crossed by the Tigre River; with an average temperature of 79 °F and an annual average rainfall of 1,200 mm. One nearby tourist destination is the Chimire Cliffs.

El Tigre also is in full conurbation with the city of San Jose de Guanipa also known as El Tigrito, capital of the Guanipa Municipality whose population according to data from the CNE is 84,526  inhabitants. Both cities are basically one, whose population would be 291,472  inhabitants.

Since the appointment of Orinoco Belt as one of the largest reserves of oil in the world, El Tigre has become one of the most important cities in Venezuela because it is very near or on the edge of this oil belt in Anzoategui state. Thus, El Tigre currently shows an increase in the establishment of companies of services to the oil industry that is constantly growing and have also been presented innumerable construction projects for new shopping malls, business buildings or towers and other works for the significant activation of tourism.

History
In the 1930s a large field of light crude oil was discovered near El Tigrito by the Mene Grande Oil Company (MGO), a subsidiary of Gulf Oil Corporation.  The Oficina No. 1 well, a wildcat well begun in 1933 and completed in 1937, established the highly productive Oficina Formation. The oil discovery led to the founding of El Tigre on February 23, 1933 when Mene Grande established their offices in Campo Oficina.  El Tigre quickly became a boomtown.  The name "Oficina" (Office) was derived from the telegraph office in El Tigrito. Until the oil discovery, the area had been sparsely populated. By 1940 a road and an oil pipeline had been constructed to connect El Tigre with Puerto La Cruz.  By 1946, 512 wells had been drilled, and the region had produced 127 million barrels of oil.  The nearby oil company camp San Tomé was built near El Tigre as the main camp for Mene Grande.

Demographics
The Simón Rodríguez Municipality, according to the 2011 Venezuelan census, has a population of 194,858 inhabitants (went up from 155,178 in 2000).  This amounts to 12.4% of Anzoátegui's population.

Geography

Limits

About the territorial extension of the municipality in which the city is located, it is 702 km2 and delimited by the following territories:

Northeast: borders the municipalities Pedro Maria Freites and Guanipa.
South: bordering the municipality Francisco de Miranda.
East: borders the municipality Guanipa.
West: bordering the municipality Francisco de Miranda.
Southeast: municipalities bordering Guanipa and Independencia.

Climate

The climate is of savannah and temperatures ranging between 68 °F (20 degrees C) and 96.8 °F (37 degrees C), with an average of 80.6 °F (27 degrees C) approximately.

Media

Radio

La Voz de EL Tigre it was the first radio station in amplitude modulated (AM) installed in the city, by Don Carlos Poleo, January 9, 1948.
 Radio Fe y Alegría 940 AM

With the development of the frequency modulation (FM) are many radio stations that have been installed, among the most representative.
 Mundo Radio 88.9 FM
 VenFM 98.9 FM
 Chimire 105.5 FM
 Radio Fe y Alegría 91.7 FM
 Orbita 97.3 FM
 Tigresa 100.1 FM
 Eclipse 90.1 FM
 Xtrema 99.7 FM
 Ídolos 96.9 FM
 Clásicos 90.9 FM
 Eco 92.1 FM
 Turpial 107.1 FM
 Fuego 89.5 FM
 Mariana Radio "La Catolica" 100.7

Local economy

Hotels 
 Hotel Green Park
 Hotel Internacional Gran Hotel
 Hotel Mancora Suites & Hotel 
 Hotel Santa Cruz
 Hotel Gemstone Inn
 Hotel Orinoco
 Hotel La Redoma
 Hotel Suites & Hotel
 Hotel Tamanaco
 Hotel La Carreta del Tigre
 Hotel Palma Real
 Hotel Luxor
 Hotel Cel (Centro Empresarial Longo)
 Hotel Erobuiling Express El Tigre
 Hotel La Fuente
 Hotel Las Tinajas
 Hotel Reina Margot
 Hotel Villa Dorada
 Hotel La Posada del Angel
 Hotel Bella Vista Suite
 Hotel Caribbean Beach
 Hotel Amadeus
 Hotel Don Pepe
 Hotel Arichuna

Malls 
 San Remo Mall
 Unimall
 Marmoto´S
 Petrucci
 Plaza Medina
 Las Virtudes
 Alba
 Paseo los Pinos
 Galerias Agua Miel
 Harris
 Venezuela
 El Coloso
 Madrid
 Paris
 Pequeños Comerciantes
 Hana
 Díaz

Main Streets and Avenues

 Ave. España (Troncal Km 16)
 Ave. Rotaria (Troncal Km 16)
 Ave. Peñalver
 Ave. Jesús Subero
 Ave. Carretera Negra
 Ave. Norte (Troncal Km 15)
 Ave. Francisco de Miranda
 Ave. 5
 Ave. Libertador
 Ave. Intercomunal 
 St. Bolívar
 St. Miranda
 St. Brasil
 St. Anzoátegui
 St. Ayacucho

Main Squares and Phials

 Plaza Bolívar
 Plaza El Libro
 Plaza Revenga
 Plaza La Patilla
 Plaza Augusto Ramirez
 Plaza José Antonio Anzoátegui
 Plaza de Estudiantes
 Plaza España.
 Redoma de Aguanca
 Redoma Cruz de los Choferes
 Bulevar José Gregorio Hernández
 El Paseo de La Virgen

Government
El Tigre is the shire town of the Simón Rodríguez Municipality in Anzoátegui.  The mayor of the Simón Rodríguez Municipality is Ernesto Raydan, elected in 2017 with 51.95% of the votes.

Main roads to other cities 
 National Trunk Highway Km 15 (Saint Joseph, El Tigre, Pariaguán).
 National Trunk Highway Km 16 (Cantaura, El Tigre, Ciudad Bolivar).
 Regional Road (El Tigre – Atapirire)

Notable people
 Ricardo Martins, footballer who plays for Deportivo Anzoátegui as a midfielder
 Jose Bonilla (boxer), former World Boxing Association (WBA) flyweight (112 lb) champion.
 José Catire Carpio, (December 19, 1940 – June 26, 2006), was a Venezuelan llanero singer.
 Jean Machi, major league baseball pitcher.
 José Tábata, outfielder for the Pittsburgh Pirates
 Luis Aponte (Boston Red Sox)
 Enzo Hernández Professional baseball player, shortstop, Padres de San Diego 71–77 y Dodgers de Los Ángeles 78

Transportation 
 El Tigre is served by San Tomé Airport .
 Passenger Terminal Cleto Quijada

References

 
Cities in Anzoátegui